Yuan Jiayong (1905 – January 16, 1991) was a member of the 28 Bolsheviks. After studying at Moscow Sun Yat-sen University in the Soviet Union, he returned to China to head the Jiangsu Committee of the Communist Party of China. In June 1934, Yuan and Li Zhusheng, another member of the 28 Bolsheviks, were arrested by the Kuomintang. Yuan decided to defect to the Kuomintang and changed his name.

References
第二节　全总白区执行局. 上海市地方志办公室. [2012-06-02].
1905 births
1991 deaths
Moscow Sun Yat-sen University alumni